Julius Cavero, T-KID (or  Terrible T-KID 170) is a well-known graffiti artist from the Bronx, New York.

Biography

Background and early life
T Kid's father was an immigrant from Peru, who worked at a GM factory in New Jersey. His mother emigrated from Puerto Rico in the mid 1950s.

Graffiti
He started in the 1970s, tagging the name "King 13" every time he'd win a challenge, performing daredevil tricks on swings in local parks. He was a short lived member of a gang called the Bronx Enchanters and The Renegades of Harlem, where he learned how to paint trains.

He later became the president of TNB (The Nasty Boyz) and ex-president of TVS (The Vamp Squad), one of the most notorious New York graffiti crews. T-KID is still active and his work can be seen in the Bronx as well as around the world. He is also a member of MAC crew from Paris. T-Kid was originally asked to be the narrator for the Hip-Hop documentary Style Wars but he declined.

Appearances in other media
More recently T-Kid has appeared in the videogame Marc Eckō's Getting Up: Contents Under Pressure.

References

External links
Official Website
Interview
2010 In depth Interview
Image
www.at149st.com

American graffiti artists
People from the Bronx
Living people
Year of birth missing (living people)